Edward Baquet (died September 21, 1993) was an American restaurateur and civil rights activist. He owned Eddie's, a Louisiana Creole cuisine restaurant in Gentilly, New Orleans. He openly supported desegregation in the 1960s.

His son, Dean Baquet, became a prominent journalist and newspaper editor and served as the executive editor of The New York Times from May 2014 to June 2022.

References

1993 deaths
People from New Orleans
American restaurateurs
American civil rights activists